Fan Lau Fort is a former military fortification located on Lantau Island in Hong Kong.  Named after the eponymous peninsula it is situated on, it was built in 1729 during the reign of the Yongzheng Emperor, a hundred and twelve years before the British took possession of Hong Kong.  Abandoned in 1898, it became a declared monument of Hong Kong in 1981.

History
Construction of the Fan Lau Fort was completed in 1729, and was overseen by Yeung Lin, the Governor of Guangdong and Guangxi provinces at the time. Its formation was recorded in the Macau Gazetteer, which recounted how the fort was one of two erected on Lantau Island during the seventh year of the Yongzheng Emperor's reign. During the early part of the Qing dynasty, the fort was known as Tai Yu Shan Fort – named after the romanized Chinese name of Lantau Island (Tai Yu Shan) – but was renamed to Kai Yik Fort during the middle and later era of the dynasty.  The purpose of the fort was to protect the passage between the island and the Pearl River estuary from pirates, who threatened the coasts and seas of southern China.  At the time, Imperial China did not have a large navy, and thus, relied on the development of forts as an alternative way to defend its coast.

This provided excellent views of the sea and a clear vantage point in case of a potential naval attack. However, the newly built fort was primitive and – in the words of local historian Jason Wordie – "quite small and relatively insignificant". It was eventually seized by the pirates it had intended to repel, but the government would have recaptured the fort in 1810, when the pirates surrendered to imperial soldiers. It was refurbished shortly after its reconquest, and was subsequently part of a key enlargement of fortifications around the area during the next decade.

In 1842, a year after the British took possession of Hong Kong Island, officers from the British Army who surveyed the area discovered that the fort was left unguarded.  Fifty-six years later, in 1898 – the year the British were granted a lease over the New Territories – Fan Lau Fort was "abandoned altogether".  A similar fate would befall other military fortifications that guarded the coastline, such as the ones in Tung Chung and Junk Island.

Restoration and present-day
After the fort was abandoned, it slowly fell into disrepair over the years.  Villagers living in Fan Lau took stones from its walls to utilize as raw materials for construction, and the old fortification was surrounded by thick foliage.  Fan Lau Fort was declared a monument on November13, 1981, and preliminary restoration works were carried out during the early part of 1985.  A more extensive restoration took place five years later in 1990, and entailed clearing away the foliage encircling the site.  In that same year, three blocks of flats were constructed close to the fort in anticipation of CLP Group's proposal to establish a HK$60 billion power station in Fan Lau.  However, the Government refused to approve of the project, and the properties were never inhabited and remain deserted.

The ruins of Fan Lau Fort is one of only two historic military fortifications on Lantau Island that have survived to the present day – the other being Tung Chung Fort.

Description
When it was first built, the fort was guarded by thirty soldiers and equipped with eight cannons, along with twenty guard houses.

See also
 Tung Chung Fort, another fort on Lantau Island
 List of the oldest buildings and structures in Hong Kong

References

External links

 
 
 
Aerial image from Google Map

Fan Lau
Archaeological sites in Hong Kong
Declared monuments of Hong Kong
Forts in Hong Kong